Windows Installer XML Toolset (WiX, pronounced "wicks"), is a free software toolset that builds Windows Installer packages from XML. It consists of a command-line environment that developers may integrate into their build processes to build MSI and MSM packages. WiX was the first Microsoft project to be released under an open-source license, the Common Public License. It was also the first Microsoft project to be hosted on an external website.

After its release in 2004, Microsoft has used WiX to package Office 2007, SQL Server 2005, Visual Studio 2005/2008, and other products.

WiX includes Votive, a Visual Studio add-in that allows creating and building WiX setup projects using the Visual Studio IDE. Votive supports syntax highlighting and IntelliSense for  source files and adds a WiX setup project type  to Visual Studio.

Tools

Candle
Candle compiles the XML documents to  object files that contain symbols and references to symbols.

Light
Light takes one or more object files and links the references in the object files to the appropriate symbols in other object files. Light is responsible for collecting all of the binaries, packaging them appropriately, and generating the final MSI or MSM file.

Lit
Lit combines multiple object files into a library for convenience.

Dark
Dark takes existing MSI and MSM files and generates XML documents that represent the package.

Heat
Heat creates WiX file list code from a file, directory, Visual Studio project, website, VB6 COM component, performance counter category, or Registry file. It produces a  file that can be compiled and linked with other  files. WiX 3.0's Heat replaced WiX 2.0's more limited Tallow tool.

There is also a third-party tool called Paraffin, available under the Common Public License, which offers several features not present in Heat. In particular, Paraffin can keep the GUIDs assigned to each file the same even when the tool is run multiple times. Paraffin can also exclude files by extension or regular expression.

Pyro
Pyro creates Patch files (msp) without the Windows Installer SDK.

Burn
Burn is a prerequisite bootstrapper and installer chainer tool, was first released in version 3.6. Features include small size, proper elevation support for Windows Vista and Windows 7, a very customizable UI and progress indicators, and automatic download of required dependencies. The old Burn source code was abandoned in July 2009 and reimplemented based on NETFX4 bootstrapper.

History
WiX was the first Microsoft project to be released under an open-source license, the Common Public License. Initially hosted on SourceForge, it was also the first Microsoft project to be hosted externally.

Rob Mensching, the original author and lead developer of WiX, works on WiX in his spare time. When he released the first version of WiX on April 5, 2004, he commented, "I did not feel that many people inside Microsoft understood what the Open Source community was really about and I wanted to improve that understanding by providing an example." As of 2006, several other Microsoft employees from various product divisions of the company worked on WiX with Mensching, meeting after business hours once a week to coordinate development efforts and write code.

WiX version 2.0 was released in 2007.

WiX version 3.0 was released July 4, 2009.

On June 6, 2010, WiX moved from SourceForge to CodePlex.

WiX version 3.5 was released January 31, 2011.

On August 14, 2012, Microsoft transferred the WiX copyright to the Microsoft-sponsored Outercurve Foundation. At the same time, the license was changed from the Common Public License to the Microsoft Reciprocal License.

WiX version 3.6 was released September 3, 2012 and has a focus on Burn.

WiX version 3.7 was released December 24, 2012. Version 3.7 supports Visual Studio 2008, 2010 and 2012.

WiX version 3.8 was released November 28, 2013. Visual Studio 2013 support is one of the major new features.

WiX version 3.9 was released October 31, 2014.

WiX version 3.10 was released September 3, 2015.

On May 4, 2016, WiX was transferred to the .NET Foundation.

WiX version 3.11 was released May 5, 2017.

WiX version 3.11.1 was released December 31, 2017.

WiX version 3.11.2 was released September 18, 2019.

Since Visual Studio 2012, the traditional setup project type has been removed from Visual Studio (available only as an extension since Visual Studio 2013). WiX is a recommended alternative.

See also

List of installation software
Shared Source Initiative

References

External links

Interview with Rob Mensching of Microsoft's WiX Project
Wax - an interactive Visual Studio extension to edit WiX source files (Free, Open Source)

C Sharp software
Free and open-source software
Free installation software
Free software programmed in C++
Free software programmed in C Sharp
Free software projects
Microsoft development tools
Microsoft free software
Windows-only free software
XML-based standards
2004 software